Brotherhood is the tenth studio album by the Japanese rock duo B'z, released on July 14, 1999. "Brotherhood" debuted with over 1,019,270 copies sold and sold over 1,391,850 copies. Brotherhood was the first of only two albums released by Rooms Records and distributed by BMG Japan.

Track listing
"F・E・A・R" – 3:45
"Giri Giri Chop (Version 51)" – 3:59
"Brotherhood" – 5:46
"Nagai Ai" – 5:37
"Yume no Youna Hibi" – 4:53
"Gin no Tsubasa de Tobe" – 3:56
"Sono Te de Furete Goran" – 3:23
"Nagare Yuku Hibi" – 4:54
"Skin" – 3:44
"Ikasete Okure!" – 3:23
"Shine" – 3:51

Personnel
Tak Matsumoto – guitar
Koshi Inaba – vocals, blues harp

Additional personnel
Akira Onozuka – organ (tracks 5, 8, 11)
Billy Sheehan – bass (tracks 2, 3, 8, 10, 11)
Daisuke Ikeda – strings arrangement & brass section (tracks 4, 6, 9)
Hironori Sawano – trumpet (track 6)
Kaichi Kurose – drums (tracks 1, 3, 4, 5, 6, 7, 8, 9, 10, 11)
Katsunori "hakkai" Hatakeyama – guitar technician
Kazuki Katsuta – saxophone (track 6)
Pat Torpey – drums (track 2)
Satoru Suzuki – manipulator
Shinozaki Strings – strings (tracks 4, 9)
Shiro Sasaki – trumpet (track 6)
Showtaro Mitsuzono – bass (tracks 1, 4, 5, 6, 7, 9)

Charts

Certifications

References

B'z albums
1999 albums
Japanese-language albums